Engrenages (French for “gears"; marketed as Spiral in the English-speaking world) is a French television police drama series created by the TV production company Son et Lumière. Since the series premiere on 13 December 2005, eight seasons have aired on Canal+ in France.

Series overview

Episodes

Season 1 (2005–06)

Season 2 (2008)

Season 3 (2010)

Season 4 (2012)

Season 5 (2014)

Season 6 (2017)

Season 7 (2019)

Season 8 (2020)

References

Spiral